Maîtresse (French for "mistress" or "teacher") is a 1975 French sex comedy film co-written and directed by Barbet Schroeder, starring Bulle Ogier and, in one of his earliest leading roles, Gérard Depardieu. The film provoked controversy in the United Kingdom and the United States due to its graphic depictions of BDSM.

Plot
Olivier, a naive provincial, comes to Paris and looks up a friend, who enlists him to sell books door to door. Ariane, an attractive young woman in her dressing gown asks them in to help, as the bath she was running has overflowed. Asked about the apartment beneath, she says the owners are away. That night the two break in to rob the place, and find it is the torture chamber of a professional dominatrix. In fact it is Ariane's workplace and she catches the intruders, asking Olivier for brief help with a client and paying him afterwards. 

Olivier becomes her live-in lover, thinking he will be the strong man for a vulnerable woman, but she is older, tougher, and a lot wiser. She tries to keep her work separate, but he struggles over the number of other men who call and the things she does with them. Eventually, his blundering efforts to take charge lead to a crisis. Her wealthy protector, who has allowed her to enjoy herself by taking a lover and running her own business, shuts it down and takes her to his country house to be with her child. When Olivier tracks her down, she takes him for a drive through the woods and crashes the car as they are making love on the move. Both emerge laughing from the smoking wreckage.

Cast
 Bulle Ogier as Ariane
 Gérard Depardieu as Olivier
 André Rouyer as Mario
 Nathalie Keryan as Lucienne
 Roland Bertin as man in cage
  as Emile
 Holger Löwenadler as Gautier

Release in the United Kingdom
Maîtresse was first submitted to the British Board of Film Classification (BBFC) in 1976. Examiners' reports agreed that the film was well made and not exploitative, but under their censorship standards of the time it had to be refused a certificate: "the actual scenes of fetishism are miles in excess of anything we have ever passed in this field". This meant that it could not be shown in a public cinema and instead was given showings in private cinema clubs. However, in 1980, the film was subsequently re-examined for public release by the BBFC, and in February 1981 was granted an 'X' certificate in a cut version. To gain the certificate, a total of 4 minutes and 47 seconds' footage was removed from three scenes, most notably the scene in which Ariane nails a client's scrotum to a plank of wood, an act that was not simulated (and was not performed onscreen by Bulle Ogier). In 2003, the film was submitted for a third time, and was passed for an 18 certificate with all previous cuts waived.

In November 2012, Maîtresse was released in a new Blu-ray Disc/DVD dual-format edition by the BFI, its first appearance on Blu-ray Disc.

The film was rated X in the United States. It was rated R18 in New Zealand for sexual violence, sex scenes and offensive language.

See also
 BDSM in culture and media
 Sadism and masochism in fiction

References

External links
 
 
 
 Maîtresse – an essay by Elliott Stein at the Criterion Collection

1975 films
1975 comedy films
1970s French-language films
1970s satirical films
1970s sex comedy films
BDSM in films
Films directed by Barbet Schroeder
Films set in Paris
Films shot in Paris
French satirical films
French sex comedy films
Gaumont Film Company films
1970s French films